Údolnice is a village and administrative part of Vranov in Benešov District in the Central Bohemian Region of the Czech Republic. It has about 10 inhabitants.

History
The first written mention of Údolnice is from 1422.

References

Neighbourhoods in the Czech Republic
Villages in Benešov District